Bjørn Thalbitzer (13 December 1895 – 31 March 1969) was a Danish tennis player. He competed in the men's singles and doubles events at the 1924 Summer Olympics.

References

External links
 

1895 births
1969 deaths
Danish male tennis players
Olympic tennis players of Denmark
Tennis players at the 1924 Summer Olympics
Sportspeople from Frederiksberg